The Central Armed Forces Museum also known as the Museum of the Soviet Army, is located in northern Moscow, Russia, near the Red Army Theater.

History
The first exposition which showed the military condition of the Soviet Republic and the Red Army was organised in Moscow in the building of today's State Universal Store, and was opened by Vladimir Lenin on the 25 May 1919, following a parade in Red Square.

On 23 December 1919 an order was issued on the formation of a museum-exposition "Life of the Red Army and Fleet" in the same location, whose purpose was to Inform the public about the achievements by post-October Revolution Soviet Russia in military education, culture and political discipline in the Red Army and Navy.

In 1920 another exhibition was organised and dedicated to the 2nd Congress of the Communist International in Moscow about the life and deeds of the Soviet Republic and its young armed forces which defend the conquests of the proletariat. More than 150,000 people visited the exhibition. In 1921 the exposition was transformed into the Museum of the Red Army and Fleet, and it was moved to Vozdvizhenka 6 in 1922, into a building (demolished in the 1930s), opposite today's Russian State Library.

The largest events in the museum's first years was the fifth anniversary exposition for the creation of the Worker-Peasant Red Army (RKKA) between 23 February and 1 November 1923 which was visited by 500 groups and 70,000 individuals. In 1924, following the opening of similar museums across the country, it was renamed the Central museum of the Red Army and Fleet. It moved to the left wing of the Central House of the Red Army on the Yekaterinvskaya (now Suvorova), in 1928. In 1951 the museum was once again renamed the Central Museum of the Soviet Army and in 1965 moved to its present location in a new, special building designed by architects N. Gaygarova and V. Barkhin. It was renamed once again the Central Museum of the Armed Forces of the USSR; it was given its present name in 1993.

Exhibits 

Over its history the museum has managed to accumulate the most prominent and important military relics of the Soviet period, creating a record of its military past. In total more than seven hundred thousand individual exhibits are now stored at the museum. The most valuable are displayed in the 25 halls of the main building.

The period of the Russian Civil War includes a photocopy of the original decree outlining the creation of the RKKA which includes Lenin's corrections; a banner of the 195th infantry regiment into which Lenin was officially conscripted; weapons, documents, awards and personal belongings of famous Red Army men such as Mikhail Frunze, Grigory Kotovsky, Vasily Chapayev and Vasily Blücher as well as others, all help to re-create the post-revolutionary atmosphere.

The most prized display is that dedicated to the Great Patriotic War, which includes the Victory Banner as well as all of the front banners and the captured Nazi ones that were used during the Victory Parade in 1945. The Great Patriotic War differs from World War II in that it began on 22 June 1941 with the German invasion of the Soviet Union. World War II (in Europe), started on 1 September 1939 with the co-ordinated attacks of Germany and the Soviet Union on Poland.

Part of the Great Patriotic War section is devoted to the Soviet Union's allies on the Western Front. There are examples of Soviet propaganda posters depicting Germany being crushed between the two fronts and maps of the Allied advance from Normandy into Germany. British and American small arms and uniforms are displayed. A life-size diorama includes a Jeep pulling a field-gun in front of a wall-sized photograph of Omaha Beach. The photograph is Omaha Beach as depicted in the movie The Longest Day (1962), not of Omaha Beach in June 1944. Among the collection are items that once belonged to Adolf Hitler and other Nazi officials.

The last halls display the post-war and modern developments of the Soviet Army and Navy, the Cold War section contains wreckage from the U-2 spy-plane that was piloted by Gary Powers and the involvement of Soviet forces in Cold War conflicts. A special display is dedicated to the Soviet involvement in Afghanistan and recent combat operations in Chechnya.

Outside the museum, there is an extended collection of military equipment and technology, including armour, artillery, railway cars, aircraft, and missiles.

Branches 
The museum operates a number of other locations as branches:

 G.K. Zhukova Cabinet Museum
 Central Air Force Museum
 Strategic Missile Forces Museum
 Air Defense Forces Museum
 Airborne History Museum
 Military Uniform History Museum
 Stalin's Bunker Museum

Gallery

References

External links

 Official website   

World War II museums in Russia
Museums established in 1919
Museums in Moscow
Military and war museums in Russia
Military of the Soviet Union
1919 establishments in Russia
Army museums in Europe